Helma is a feminine German or Dutch given name, and a Czech surname.  Notable persons with that name include:

 Helma Knorscheidt (born 1956), East German shot putter
 Helma Lehmann (born 1953), German rower
 Helma Neppérus (born 1950), Dutch politician
 Helma Orosz (born 1953), German politician
 Helma Sanders-Brahms (1940–2014), German film director

See also
 Hilma

Feminine given names